Ante Budimir (born 22 July 1991) is a Croatian professional footballer who plays as a forward for La Liga club Osasuna and the Croatia national team.

Club career

FC St. Pauli
In August 2014, Budimir joined German club FC St. Pauli of the 2. Bundesliga on a four-year deal until 2018. St. Pauli had to pay a transfer fee believed to be around €900,000. In an interview on Budimir's signing, former Croatian international Jurica Vranješ described him as "tall, strong in the air, and reliable in combinations" and compared his style to Dimitar Berbatov. Budimir had a tough time at St. Pauli, scoring one goal in 20 appearances in the St. Pauli shirt.

Crotone and Sampdoria
On 1 September 2015, Budimir was loaned out to Italian club Crotone for the remainder of the season. He made his Crotone debut on 7 September 2015, in a 4–0 loss to Cagliari Calcio, coming on as a 71st-minute substitute for Pietro De Giorgio. In March 2016, Crotone exercised their €1 million buyout option on the player. Budimir ended the season as Crotone's top goalscorer with 16 goals in 40 Serie B appearances, as they were promoted as runners-up to Cagliari; this tally was fourth for goalscorers in the whole league season.

In June 2016, ahead of Crotone's debut Serie A season, Sampdoria of the same league activated Budimir's release clause believed to be in the region of €1.8 million, and the player signed a deal ending in mid-2020. A year later, he was sent back to Crotone on a one-year loan with obligation to buy. The obligation was fulfilled by now relegated Crotone at the end of the season, and he remained in the club on a permanent contract.

Mallorca
On 15 January 2019, Budimir moved on loan to Spanish club Mallorca. He scored his first goal for the Balearic club on 3 February as a Panenka penalty kick in a 2–0 home win over AD Alcorcón, later being sent off. On 27 June, after achieving promotion to La Liga – he scored the opening goal as they overturned a 2–0 first-leg deficit to defeat Deportivo de La Coruña 3–2 on aggregate in the play-off final – he signed a permanent deal for a €2.2 million fee.

During the 2019–20 season Budimir scored 13 goals, which also placed him as the 8th best 2019–20 La Liga top scorer.

Osasuna
On 5 October 2020, Budimir was loaned to top tier side CA Osasuna for the 2020–21 season.

On 7 June 2021, Osasuna announced the signing of Budimir on a permanent deal until June 2025.

International career
On 27 August 2020, during pre-season training, Budimir was called up by the Croatia national team coach Zlatko Dalić for September Nations League clashes against Portugal and France. He made his national team debut on 7 October in a friendly 2–1 victory over Switzerland, providing Mario Pašalić with an assist for the winning goal. He scored his debut goal on 11 November in a friendly 3–3 draw with Turkey. He notably handled the ball with his elbow during the build-up to the goal, which referee Slavko Vinčić failed to notice.

Personal life
Budimir's family comes from the village of Ozimica in Bosnia and Herzegovina, and he was born in Zenica as it was the nearest town with an adequate hospital. Fleeing the war, the family moved to Croatia when Budimir was 6 months old.

Career statistics

Club

International

Scores and results list Croatia's goal tally first, score column indicates score after each Budimir goal.

Honours 
Croatia

 FIFA World Cup third place: 2022

References

External links
 
 
 

1991 births
Living people
Sportspeople from Zenica
Croats of Bosnia and Herzegovina
Croatian footballers
Association football forwards
Croatia international footballers
Croatia youth international footballers
Croatia under-21 international footballers
UEFA Euro 2020 players
2022 FIFA World Cup players
Croatian Football League players
LASK players
HNK Gorica players
NK Inter Zaprešić players
NK Lokomotiva Zagreb players
2. Bundesliga players
Regionalliga players
FC St. Pauli players
Serie A players
Serie B players
F.C. Crotone players
U.C. Sampdoria players
La Liga players
Segunda División players
RCD Mallorca players
CA Osasuna players
Croatian expatriate footballers
Croatian expatriate sportspeople in Austria
Expatriate footballers in Austria
Croatian expatriate sportspeople in Germany
Expatriate footballers in Germany
Croatian expatriate sportspeople in Italy
Expatriate footballers in Italy
Croatian expatriate sportspeople in Spain
Expatriate footballers in Spain